Wayne Bullimore (born 12 September 1970 in Sutton-in-Ashfield, England) is an English former footballer who played midfield for seven clubs.

Playing career
Bullimore started as a trainee at Manchester United but was released without playing a game. He signed on a free transfer for Barnsley where he made his professional start. He also signed for Stockport County, Scunthorpe United, Bradford City, Peterborough United and Scarborough. He also had a loan spell at Doncaster Rovers. He works for former club Barnsley in their Community Sports and Education Trust.

Honours
Individual
 PFA Team of the Year: 1994–95 Third Division

References

External links

1970 births
Living people
English footballers
Manchester United F.C. players
Barnsley F.C. players
Stockport County F.C. players
Scunthorpe United F.C. players
Bradford City A.F.C. players
Doncaster Rovers F.C. players
Peterborough United F.C. players
Scarborough F.C. players
Grantham Town F.C. players
Barrow A.F.C. players
Wakefield F.C. players
Belper Town F.C. players
Stocksbridge Park Steels F.C. players
Bradford (Park Avenue) A.F.C. players
English Football League players
Stalybridge Celtic F.C. players
Association football midfielders